Emily Cook (born September 17, 1986) is a beauty queen from Marietta, Georgia.  She was Miss Georgia 2009 and competed in the Miss America 2010 pageant.

She originally was runner up for Miss Georgia 2009, but became the winner when the original winner, Kristina Higgins, stepped down for undisclosed reasons after one day.

After completing her year of service during which she traveled over 30,000 miles inside Georgia, she began her legal studies at the University of Georgia Law School.

Her personal platform was breast cancer awareness in young women and she has continued to advocate for breast cancer awareness since giving up her title.  She raised money and awareness by completing the Tough Mudder adventure race in 2010 and continues to work closely with Bikers Battling Breast Cancer and the Pink Kick Starter Project.

In the fall of 2019, she opened Southern Belle Georgia Boy in Atlanta, Georgia, with her husband, Joey Ward.  It menus celebrate the community of people & farms as well as the multi-cultural culinary influences of modern Atlanta.  The restaurant closed temporarily on January 1, 2021, due to the COVID-19 pandemic.

References

External links

1986 births
Living people
Miss America 2010 delegates
People from Marietta, Georgia
American beauty pageant winners
University of Miami alumni
University of Georgia School of Law alumni